James Larkin Jnr (20 August 1904 – 18 February 1969) was an Irish Labour Party politician and trade union official. 

He was born in Liverpool, England, the eldest of four sons of James Larkin, trade union leader, and Elizabeth Larkin (née Brown), daughter of a baptist lay preacher from County Down. After the family's move to Dublin in 1909, James was educated at St. Enda's School, Rathfarnham, the only school that would accept the young Larkins owing to the reputation of their father. James endured much hardship as a child during the period of his father's intense union activity, including eviction from the family home in Auburn Street.

He first stood for election as an Irish Worker League candidate at the September 1927 general election for the Dublin County constituency but was unsuccessful. His father, James Larkin, was a successful candidate for the Dublin North constituency at the same general election. The younger Larkin was one of two candidates for the Revolutionary Workers' Groups in the 1930 newly reformed Dublin City Council elections, and he was elected.
He was also an unsuccessful independent candidate at the 1932 general election for the Dublin South constituency. On the foundation of the Communist Party of Ireland in 1933, Larkin became its chairman.

He attended the International Lenin School with Padraic Breslin and Sean Murray.

He was first elected to Dáil Éireann as a Labour Party Teachta Dála (TD) for the Dublin South constituency at the 1943 general election, where he sat in the same Dáil as his father. He was re-elected at the 1944 general election for the same constituency. At the 1948 general election, when the constituency was divided, he was elected for the Dublin South-Central constituency and was re-elected at the 1951 and 1954 general elections. He did not contest the 1957 general election.

See also
Families in the Oireachtas

References

1904 births
1969 deaths
Irish trade unionists
Labour Party (Ireland) TDs
Members of the 11th Dáil
Members of the 12th Dáil
Members of the 13th Dáil
Members of the 14th Dáil
Members of the 15th Dáil
Politicians from County Dublin
Presidents of the Irish Congress of Trade Unions
International Lenin School alumni
People educated at St. Enda's School